Leces is one of nine parishes (administrative divisions) in Ribadesella, a municipality within the province and autonomous community of Asturias, in northern Spain.

Villages
Abeo (Abéu)
Barredo (Barréu)
Bones
Pando (Pandu)
San Esteban (Sanisteba)
San Pedro (San Pedru La Llama)
Tereñes
Torre
Vega

Parishes in Ribadesella